Murder Was the Case is a 1994 short film and soundtrack album starring and performed by Snoop Doggy Dogg. The 18 minute film was directed by Dr. Dre and Fab Five Freddy and chronicles the fictional death of Snoop Dogg and his resurrection after making a deal with the Devil. The film's title comes from Snoop's song of the same name from his debut album, Doggystyle, which had been released a year earlier.

The single "What Would You Do?" by Tha Dogg Pound was included on the Natural Born Killers soundtrack and was nominated for the Grammy Award for Best Rap Performance by a Duo or Group in the 38th Annual Grammy Awards in 1996. The album was re-released with a bonus DVD containing 3 music videos on July 11, 2006.

Tupac Shakur was paid $200,000 by Death Row Records owner Suge Knight to record a song for the album, but the track ("Life's So Hard" featuring Snoop Doggy Dogg) was never used on the official soundtrack release; it was later released on the soundtrack for his posthumously released film, Gang Related.

Reception

Rolling Stone (12/29/94-1/12/95, p. 178) - "...[It] isn't the trailblazer that Dre's The Chronic was last year. But it is rap very nearly as strong. Featuring West Coast stalwarts...and new discoveries..., Dre and Dat Nigga Daz present gangsta- and R&B-infected fare that slams..."
Entertainment Weekly (11/11/94, p. 76) - "...confirms...Dr. Dre as the new king of pop. In addition to the ominous remix of Snoop's title song, Dre reunites with Ice Cube...Dre's G-funk sound may be the hardest in the land, but it's also the most gut-wrenchingly soulful..." - Rating: A
Q magazine (1/95, p. 258) - 3 Stars - Good - "...While most ears will be tuned to the bile'n'beats of "Natural Born Killaz"...the best track here is from Snoop's young protege, Nate Dogg....One of West Coast rap's more imaginative albums."
The Source (1/95, p. 85) - 4 Stars - Slammin' - "...while Jodeci duets with Tha Dogg Pound and an all-star cast to try their hand at the G-Funk sound, Dre begins plotting his next move...heavy-metal bass meets chunky keyboards..."
NME (12/24/94, p. 23) - Ranked #8 in NME's list of the 10 best compilation albums of 1994.
NME (10/15/94, p. 53) - 7 - Very Good - "...anyone expecting this to signal Dre's decline is kidding themselves. Murder Was the Case shows the old dogg has plenty of new tricks..."

Commercial performance 
In the United States, on the chart dated November 5, 1994, Murder Was the Case debuted on the Billboard 200 at number one, powered by first week sales 329,000 units. The album opened at the top spot of the R&B/Hip-Hop Albums chart.

The following week it stayed on top with 197,000 copies sold and was certified Gold. The album is certified 2× platinum with 2,030,000 copies sold.

Track listing

Samples 
"21 Jumpstreet"
 "Nobody Can Be You (But You)" by Steve Arrington

"Who Got Some Gangsta Shit?"
  "P.S.K. (What Does It Mean?)" by Schoolly D
  "6 in the Mornin'" by Ice-T

"Come When I Call"
 "Let Me Love You" by Michael Henderson

"Woman to Woman"
 "Woman to Woman" by Shirley Brown

"Dollaz & Sense"
 "I Like (What You're Doing to Me)" by Young & Company

'"Eastside-Westside"
 "Dazz" by Brick

Personnel
Executive Producer: Suge Knight
Soundtrack director: Dr. Dre
Overseer: Dat Nigga Daz
Recorded at Can-Am Studios
Mixed at Dr. Dre's Crib 
Death Row Engineers: Kesden Wright, Tommy D. Daugherty & Danny Alonso
Photographers: Yoko Sato, Simone Green
Background Vocals: Nanci Fletcher, Barbara Wilson, Danette Williams

Cover versions
Jeremy Messersmith with Andy Thompson performed a cover of "Murder Was the Case" at The Cake Shop in Minneapolis, MN for a 'Murder and Death' concept show on 1/10/2010.
South Park Mexican's song "Woodson N' Worthin" is a cover of "Murder Was the Case".
 Don Vito and Mad DPS covered the song on the 2008 compilation album The Triple-Six Mixtape.

Charts

Weekly charts

Year-end charts

Certifications

See also 
 List of number-one albums of 1994 (U.S.)
 List of number-one R&B albums of 1994 (U.S.)

References

External links 

 Review

1994 soundtrack albums
Film soundtracks
Horrorcore albums
Snoop Dogg albums
Hip hop soundtracks
Gangsta rap soundtracks
Albums produced by G-One
Albums produced by Dr. Dre
Albums produced by DJ Quik
Albums produced by Soopafly
Albums produced by Sam Sneed
Albums produced by Daz Dillinger
Death Row Records soundtracks
West Coast hip hop soundtracks